Absolute Hope Absolute Hell is the third studio album by American deathcore band Fit for an Autopsy. The album was released October 2, 2015 through eOne Music and was produced by the band's guitarist Will Putney.

Track listing

Personnel 
Credits adapted from album's liner notes.

Fit for an Autopsy
 Joe Badolato – lead vocals
 Pat Sheridan – guitars, backing vocals
 Will Putney – guitars, bass, production, engineering, mixing, mastering
 Tim Howley – guitars
 Josean Orta – drums

Additional musicians
 Brendan Murphy of Counterparts – guest vocals on "Storm Drains"

Additional personnel
 Randy Leboeuf – additional engineering
 Tom Smith, Jr. – additional engineering
 Steve Seid – editing
 Robert W. Cook – artwork

Charts

References

External links 
 

2015 albums
Fit for an Autopsy albums